The Worsley family is an English family that is derived from Sir Elias de Workesley, a Norman knight who was a youth at the time of the Norman conquest. He later accompanied Duke Robert II of Normandy (elder son of William the Conqueror) on the First Crusade and was buried at Rhodes.

There have been two baronetcies created for the Worsley family.



Worsley baronets, of Appuldurcombe (1611)

The Worsley baronetcy, of Appuldurcombe in the County of Hampshire, was created in the Baronetage of England on 29 June 1611 for Richard Worsley.  On the death of the fourth Baronet, the title passed to a branch of the family living at Pylewell, near Lymington, Hampshire. All except the sixth and eighth Baronets were Members of Parliament for Newport, Isle of Wight, as were several other members of the family, including Henry Worsley, who was also successively British Envoy to Portugal and Governor of Barbados. The title became extinct on the death of the ninth Baronet in 1825. This branch of the Worsley family is now represented by the Earls of Yarborough.
Sir Richard Worsley, 1st Baronet (–1621)
Sir Henry Worsley, 2nd Baronet (1613–1666)
Sir Robert Worsley, 3rd Baronet (c. 1643–1675)
Sir Robert Worsley, 4th Baronet (c. 1669–1747)
Sir James Worsley, 5th Baronet (1672–1756)
Sir Thomas Worsley, 6th Baronet (1728–1768)
Sir Richard Worsley, 7th Baronet (1751–1805)
Sir Henry Worsley-Holmes, 8th Baronet (1756–1811)
Sir Leonard Thomas Worsley-Holmes, 9th Baronet (1787–1825), father in law of William à Court-Holmes, 2nd Baron Heytesbury.

Worsley baronets, of Hovingham Hall (1838)

The Worsley baronetcy, of Hovingham Hall in the County of York, was created in the Baronetage of the United Kingdom on 10 August 1838 for William Worsley. The fourth Baronet was Lord Lieutenant of the North Riding of Yorkshire and father of Katharine, Duchess of Kent. The fifth Baronet was a Conservative politician.
Sir William Worsley, 1st Baronet (1792–1879)
Sir William Cayley Worsley, 2nd Baronet (1828–1897)
Sir William Henry Arthington Worsley, 3rd Baronet (1861–1936)
Colonel Sir William Arthington Worsley, 4th Baronet (1890–1973)
Sir (William) Marcus John Worsley, 5th Baronet (1925–2012)
Sir William Ralph Worsley, 6th Baronet (born 1956)

The heir apparent to the baronetcy is Marcus William Bernard Worsley (born 1995), only son of the 6th Baronet.

See also
 Charles Worsley
 Appuldurcombe House
 Earl of Yarborough
 Darwin–Wedgwood family

Notes

References
Kidd, Charles, Williamson, David (editors). Debrett's Peerage and Baronetage (1990 edition). New York: St Martin's Press, 1990, 

 

 
1611 establishments in England
Extinct baronetcies in the Baronetage of England
1825 disestablishments in England
1838 establishments in the United Kingdom
Baronetcies in the Baronetage of the United Kingdom